Elias Sekgobelo "Ace" Magashule (born 3 November 1959) is a South African politician and former anti-apartheid activist who was Secretary General of the African National Congress (ANC) until his suspension on 3 May 2021. He served as the Premier of the Free State, one of South Africa's nine provinces, from 2009 until 2018, and is known to be influential in the ANC of his home province.

An outspoken ally of former President Jacob Zuma, Magashule has been accused of various corrupt activities. He was arrested in November 2020 and awaits trial on charges relating to corruption under a government contract awarded while he was Premier.

Early life
Magashule attended Tumahole Primary School (now Lembede Primary) and Phehellang Secondary School in his hometown of Tumahole, Parys. He gained his nickname, "Ace," on the school soccer field. He received his Bachelor of Arts degree from Fort Hare University, and after graduating taught at Moqhaka High School in Sebokeng and later at Phehellang, his own former school.

In his youth, Magashule was a member of the Congress of South African Students and the Tumahole Youth Congress. In 1982, while a student at the Fort Hare, he was arrested following a protest against a visit by Ciskei Prime Minister Lennox Sebe, and convicted of public violence. His official ANC biography claims that he was charged with high treason, but this is contradicted by court records. In the 1980s, he played a role in the United Democratic Front (UDF) in the Northern Free State, and participated in organising rent boycotts in Tumahole. He was detained for his UDF activities in 1985. He went into exile in 1989 and returned in 1991 after the ANC and other anti-apartheid groups were unbanned.

Political career

ANC membership 
Magashule was elected Chairperson of the ANC's Northern Free State region in 1991, after the ANC was unbanned, and became Deputy Chairperson of the newly created Free State provincial branch in 1994. He was elected chairperson of the branch in 1998, and ultimately became the ANC's longest-serving provincial chairperson. During his leadership of the branch, the results of its elective conference were successfully challenged twice in court, once in 2012 and once in 2017, and he has been accused of rigging votes. As provincial chairperson, he was part of what is known as the "Premier League," an unofficial lobbying group within the ANC which was influential during the presidency of Jacob Zuma, to whom it was aligned, and which consisted of Magashule, Supra Mahumapelo of the North West, and DD Mabuza of Mpumalanga.

Magashule was directly elected to the party's National Executive Committee in 2007, after having served as an ex officio member of the committee for a decade in his capacity as a provincial chairperson. In December 2017, during the party's 54th National Conference, he was elected Secretary General, pursuant to a recount – his opponents had disputed the result and demanded that 68 "missing" ballots be accounted for. He had run on the slate of the losing presidential candidate, Nkosazana Dlamini-Zuma, and was backed by the Premier League.

Career in government 

 Served as MEC of Economic Affairs between 1994 and 1996
 Served as MEC of Transport.
 Deployed to National Assembly, August 1997.
 Served as MEC of Agriculture between 2004 and 2005
 Served as MEC of Sports, Arts and Recreation between 2007 and 2008.
 Served as MEC of Safety and Security in 2008.

Magashule was appointed Premier of the Free State on 6 May 2009, replacing Beatrice Marshoff. As Premier, he initiated Operation Hlasela, a campaign to fight poverty in the Free State, and established a bursary fund for tertiary students in the Premier's office.

Arrest and criminal charges 
On 10 November 2020, the Hawks issued a warrant for Magashule's arrest on 21 charges of corruption, theft, fraud and money laundering. The charges relate to a R255-million contract which the Free State Department of Human Settlements awarded to Blackhead Consulting in 2014, while Magashule was Premier, for the auditing and removal of asbestos from homes in the province. The National Prosecuting Authority claims that, following receipt of the contract, Magashule's personal assistant asked a Blackhead subsidiary to make various payments to third parties, either at Magashule's instruction or with his knowledge. These payments included R50,000 for the school fees of the child of an alleged ally of the Gupta family, Refiloe Mokoena, previously of the South African Revenue Service. The trial of Magashule and the fifteen co-accused has been postponed several times due to applications brought by Magashule, who claims that the charges are politically motivated.

ANC suspension 
In early May 2021, the ANC National Working Committee suspended Magashule from the position of ANC Secretary General until the conclusion of the court proceedings. He had been given 30 days to voluntarily "step aside" from his party leadership positions, under the ANC's new step-aside rule. He refused to accept his suspension and in turn sought to suspend Cyril Ramaphosa, the ANC and national President. On 13 September 2021, the Gauteng High Court dismissed Magashule's application to appeal his suspension.

Other corruption allegations 
Magashule has been the subject of many journalistic investigations alleging his corrupt activities, and has been accused of participating in state capture during the Zuma presidency. In 2011 Magashule and Mohloua Seoe were linked to a government property deal that was awarded to a company of which both were once co-directors. In November 2017 the winner of a tender from the provincial government Magashule headed alleged that Magashule had personally encouraged him to act as a front for the contract.

In January 2018, the Hawks raided Magashule's offices in connection with the Vrede Dairy Project, calling it a "scheme designed to defraud and steal monies" from the Free State Department of Agriculture.

Children
One of his sons, Tshepiso "Gift" Magashule, was employed as a consultant by the Gupta family since November 2010, shortly after Duduzane Zuma was brought under their influence. In 2011 Gift joined the Gupta brothers on a three-week holiday to New York and Venice, and he was later appointed a director in a Gupta company, earning R90,000 a month. Ace Magashule alleged that Gift's link to the Guptas was no secret. In 2015 the Guptas treated Gift and his brother Thato to an eight-day stay in the Oberoi Hotel, Dubai.

In 2015 a busy Shell fuel station in Phuthaditjhaba, owned by the Free State Development Corporation (FDC), was acquired by Ace's 27-year-old daughter Thoko Alice Malembe. As the deal involved an R11.5 million upfront rental fee from Shell, and a purchase price of R2.9 million, reportedly below its market value, it resulted in a windfall of some R8.9 million for Malembe's MMAT trust. Magashule denied any involvement, despite a security video of 18 December 2014 which confirmed his exploratory visit to the fuel station, in the company of two FDC board members, and apparently, Malembe. The fuel station's 60 employees had to be retrenched by their former employer, when it lost its case against the FDC. After she was reunited with her father in 2011, Malembe registered Botlokwa Holdings in 2013, which managed to secure a series of government tenders and property deals from the Free State provincial government. Malembe's trust or company also acquired a Botshabelo fuel station from the FDC for R2.88 million (or R4 million according to the FDC), despite an offer of R5.5 million from another investor.

Associates

Ace Magashule is a long-time friend of Hantsi Matseke, chairperson of the FDC. Matseke owns Maono Construction which has been awarded contracts worth R515 million by government departments and municipalities in the Free State. Magashule has denied influencing any of these. Maono Construction has however subcontracted work to Malembe's Botlokwa Holdings.

See also 

 Gangster State – 2019 book about Magashule

References

African National Congress politicians
Premiers of the Free State (province)
1959 births
Living people
People from Ngwathe Local Municipality
University of Fort Hare alumni
Members of the Free State Provincial Legislature
Corruption in South Africa